Gerhard Brosi (8 August 1943 – 3 April 1984) was a German politician of the Social Democratic Party (SPD) and former member of the German Bundestag.

Life 
In 1983 he entered the Bundestag via the Landesliste Baden-Württemberg and was then a member of the German Bundestag until his death.

Literature

References

1943 births
1984 deaths
Members of the Bundestag for Baden-Württemberg
Members of the Bundestag 1983–1987
Members of the Bundestag for the Social Democratic Party of Germany